Ohangaron is a district-level city in Tashkent Region, Uzbekistan. It is the administrative center of Ohangaron District, but not part of it.

References

Populated places in Tashkent Region
Cities in Uzbekistan